Kin Ming, previously called Kin Shin from 2011 to 2015, is one of the 24 constituencies of the Sai Kung District Council in Hong Kong. The seat elects one member of the council every four years.

Since its creation in 2007, the boundary of the constituency is loosely based on part of Kin Ming Estate in Tiu King Leng.

Councillors represented

Election results

2010s

2000s

Notes

References

 2011 District Council Election Results (Sai Kung)
 2007 District Council Election Results (Sai Kung)
 2003 District Council Election Results (Sai Kung)
 1999 District Council Election Results (Sai Kung)
 

Constituencies of Hong Kong
Constituencies of Sai Kung District Council
2007 establishments in Hong Kong
Constituencies established in 2007